Saʿīd ibn al-ʿĀṣ al-Umawī (died 678/679) was the Muslim governor of Kufa under Caliph Uthman and governor of Medina under Caliph Mu'awiya I. Like the aforementioned caliphs, Sa'id belonged to the Umayyad clan of the Quraysh.

During his governorship of Kufa, Sa'id led military campaigns in Azerbaijan and near the Caspian Sea. However, he had to contend with dissent from some of the Kufan elite, led by Malik ibn al-Ashtar. The dissent was largely driven by Sa'id and Uthman's policy of consolidating ownership of the productive Sawad lands of Iraq into the hands of the Quraysh and Muslim veterans from Medina. Sa'id had the dissidents exiled, but during a visit to Medina, rebels in Kufa led by Yazid ibn Qays al-Arhabi took control of the city.

After his ouster from Kufa, Sa'id aided in the defense of Uthman's house from attack by Egyptian rebels, but Uthman was killed nonetheless and Sa'id was wounded. He declined to fight alongside the Banu Umayya and Aisha against Caliph Ali (r. 656–661) during the First Fitna, an act for which he was favorably remembered in Islamic historiography. He was appointed governor of Medina by the Umayyad caliph Mu'awiya I in 669, but replaced by Marwan ibn al-Hakam in 674. Sa'id then retired to his estate outside the city where he died. One of his sons, Amr al-Ashdaq, succeeded him as leader of his clan.

Origins, early life and family 
Sa'id was the only son of his father, al-As ibn Sa'id ibn al-As ibn Umayya, a pagan warrior of the Quraysh who was killed by the early Muslims in the Battle of Badr in 624. His uncle was Khalid ibn Sa'id, Amr ibn Sa'id, Aban ibn Sa'id, and Ubayda ibn Sa'id. They belonged to the A'yas grouping within the Banu Umayya (Umayyads), a sub-clan of the Quraysh. Sa'id was likely an infant when his father was slain. His grandfather Abu Uhayha Sa'id ibn al-As (d. 622/23) was a ruler in Mecca and, in deference to his status among the Quraysh, was referred to as dhū al-tāj (owner of the crown) and no Meccan wore a turban the same color as his, though he was not a formal king. Sa'id's mother, Umm Kulthum bint Amr, was also a Qurayshite, and his maternal grandmother Umm Habib bint al-As was the sister of Abu Uhayha.

According to the historian Clifford Edmund Bosworth, Sa'id "speedily achieved great prestige in Islam not only as the leader of an aristocratic family group, but also for his liberality, eloquence and learning". He gained particular favor under his kinsman, Caliph Uthman. Probably around 652–654, Uthman appointed Sa'id to help canonize the modern-day Qur'an, a task he shared with Abd Allah ibn al-Zubayr, Abd al-Rahman ibn al-Harith and Zayd ibn Thabit. Sa'id married two of Uthman's daughters, Maryam al-Sughra and Umm Amr. From the latter, he had his sons Dawud, Sulayman al-Akbar, Uthman al-Asghar, Mu'awiya and daughter Amina, while from Maryam al-Sughra he had his son Sa'id. He also married Umm al-Banin bint al-Hakam, a sister of Marwan ibn al-Hakam, another member of the Banu Umayya, who bore him his eldest son, Uthman al-Akbar, and sons Amr al-Ashdaq, Muhammad, Umar, Abd Allah al-Akbar and al-Hakam.

From his wife Umm Habib bint Jubayr ibn Mut'im he had his son Abd Allah al-Asghar, from his wife al-Aliyya bint Salama he had Yahya and Ayyub, from Juwayriyya bint Sufyan he had his sons Aban, Khalid and al-Zubayr, from A'isha, a daughter of Jarir ibn Abd Allah al-Bajali, he had his son Jarir and daughter Umm Sa'id, from Umayma bint Amir al-Bajaliyya he had his daughters Ramla, Umm Uthman and Umayma, from a certain Bint Salama ibn Qays he had his son Ibrahim, from his wife Umm Habib bint Buhayr he had his daughter A'isha al-Saghira and from Umm Salama bint Habib he had his son Sulayman al-Asghar. From various slave women (ummahat awlad; singular umm walad) unnamed in the sources, he had his sons Anbasa and Utba, and daughters Hafsa, A'isha al-Kabira, Umm Amr, Umm Yahya, Fatikha, Umm Habib al-Kabira, Umm Habib al-Saghira, Umm Kulthum, Sara, Umm Dawud, Umm Sulayman, Umm Ibrahim and Humayda.

Governor of Kufa 
In 649/650, Sa'id was appointed governor of Kufa, replacing al-Walid ibn Uqba. During his tenure, his military reputation was boosted by campaigns in Azerbaijan and near the Caspian Sea. However, from the start, he faced issues with the Kufan elite, which consisted of Arab tribal settlers, Muslim veterans from the Battle of Qadisiyya and the qurra (Qur'an reciters). Many among the elite were incensed by Uthman's seizure of the conquered lands of the Sasanian royals and nobility in Iraq, which he planned to distribute to the tribesmen of Quraysh and certain men from Medina, in exchange for their properties in the Arabian Peninsula. Those two groups made up the early settlers in Kufa, who took part in the conquest of Iraq. By the time of Uthman, a large influx of newcomers from Arabia moved to Kufa and the Sawad, reducing the collective profits of the early settlers and prompting Sa'id to send a complaint about the crisis to Uthman in 651. Uthman's policy was meant to be a solution to this situation and stood in stark contrast to Caliph Umar, under whom the Sawad lands were collectively held by the Muslim community. The newcomers were not able to benefit from the proposed land exchange since most did not own property elsewhere.

Sa'id pursued Uthman's policy and stated "the Sawad [of Iraq] is the garden of Quraysh", i.e. that the land was to be owned by his tribe. According to 8th-century historian Sayf ibn Umar, troubles came to a head when a certain young man of the Banu Asad, Abd al-Rahman ibn Hubaysh, remarked in the presence of Sa'id and the Kufan elite that Sa'id should take possession of the Sawad's lands. This aroused the anger of Malik ibn l-Ashtar and the qurra. The young man's father insisted the remark was innocent, but al-Ashtar believed Sa'id had the event staged to justify the impending property confiscations. Ibn Hubaysh and his father were severely beaten, prompting the Banu Asad to besiege Sa'id's residence demanding retribution. Sa'id calmed the tribesmen and strongly condemned the actions of the qurra. With Uthman's sanction, the ten leading Kufan dissenters, including al-Ashtar, were exiled to Syria.

Uthman summoned Sa'id to Medina for consultations regarding the state of the caliphate in 655. During his absence, the qurra and other dissidents led by a certain Yazid ibn Qays al-Arhabi and Ibn al-Ashtar seized control of Kufa, preventing Sa'id from returning at the end of the year. Forced to return to Medina, he was replaced by Abu Musa al-Ash'ari, who was favored by the rebels.

Later life 

Sa'id took part in the defense of Uthman's house when it was besieged by Egyptian rebels in 656. The caliph was ultimately killed and Sa'id was wounded in the attack. In the aftermath, he was set to join Aisha, Talha ibn Ubayd Allah and Zubayr ibn al-Awwam in their pursuit of vengeance over Uthman's death. However, he refused to fight alongside them against Uthman's successor, Caliph Ali at the Battle of the Camel. Instead, he settled in Mecca. Despite not participating in the war with Ali, Caliph Mu'awiya I, a leading opponent of Ali, appointed Sa'id governor of Medina in 669. He replaced Marwan ibn al-Hakam until the latter was reappointed to the post in 674.

Afterward, Sa'id moved back to his estates at Wadi al-Aqiq near Medina. He died there, at the al-Arsa estate, in 678/679. Despite being a member of the Banu Umayya, his good relations with the Banu Hashim (the family of Muhammad and Ali) and his refusal to fight against Ali contributed to his positive image in later Islamic historiography. He was survived by some fourteen of his sons, including Amr al-Ashdaq, who became the leader of his family until his execution in 689 for revolting against the Umayyad caliph Abd al-Malik. Nothing is known about his sons from Caliph Uthman's daughters, other than the descendants of Uthman al-Asghar lived in Kufa. Amina was later wed and divorced by the Umayyad prince Khalid ibn Yazid. Sa'id's sons Yahya and Anbasa were involved in al-Ashdaq's rebellion against Abd al-Malik, but were both pardoned after the intercession of the caliph's brother Abd al-Aziz. Anbasa later became a close aide of the practical viceroy of Iraq, al-Hajjaj ibn Yusuf. Sa'id's daughter Umm Uthman married, in succession, Sa'id ibn Khalid ibn Amr, a great-grandson of Caliph Uthman, and the Umayyad prince Abd Allah ibn Yazid.

Notes

References

Bibliography 

679 deaths
7th-century Arabs
Banu Umayya
Generals of the Rashidun Caliphate
People from Medina
Rashidun governors of Kufa
Umayyad governors of Medina